This article is a list of any town, village, hamlet and settlements in the Stirling council area of Scotland.

A
 Abbey Craig
 Aberfoyle
 Ardchyle
 Ardeonaig
 Arnprior
 Ashfield
 Auchlyne

B
 Balfron, 
 Balmaha
 Bannockburn,
 Ben Ledi
 Blair Drummond, 
 Blairlogie
 Blanefield
 Boquhan
 Boreland
 Braeval
 Brig o' Turk
 Bridge of Allan
 Broomridge
 Buchlyvie

C
 Callander, 
 Cambusbarron
 Cambuskenneth, 
 Campsie Fells
 Carbeth
 Carse of Lecropt
 Cauldhame
 Cobleland
 Cornton, 
 Cowie
 Craigdownings
 Craighat
 Craigruie
 Crianlarich
 Croftamie

D
 Dalmary
 Deanston
 Doune, Doune Castle
 Drymen
 Dumgoyne
 Dumyat
 Dunblane,
 Dykehead

F
Fallin
Falls of Dochart 
Falls of Lochay
Fintry, 
Flanders Moss

G
 Garbh Uisge
 Gargunnock,
 Gartachoil
 Gartmore
 Gartness
 Glen Dochart
 Glengoyne Distillery

I
 Inchmahome, 
 Inchtalla
 Inversnaid

K
 Killearn
 Killin
 Kinbuck
 Kinlochard
 Kippen

L
 Lake of Menteith
 Lecropt, Lecropt Kirk, Carse of Lecropt
 Logie

M
 Milton
 Milton of Buchanan
 Moirlanich Longhouse
 Mugdock,

O
 Old Plean

P
 Pass of Leny
 Plean
 Port Of Menteith

Q

R
 Raploch

S
Stirling,
St Ninians
Strathblane
Strathyre
Stronachlachar

T
 Tamavoid
 Thornhill
 Throsk
 Tolbooth
 Touch, Touch Hills
 Torbrex Village
 Tyndrum

U
University of Stirling

W
 West Highland Way

Lists of places in Scotland
Populated places in Scotland